The flag of Guyana, known as The Golden Arrowhead, has been the national flag of Guyana since May, 1966 when the country became independent from the United Kingdom.  It was designed by Whitney Smith, an American vexillologist (though originally without the black and white fimbriations, which were later additions suggested by the College of Arms in the United Kingdom). The proportions of the national flag are 3:5. 

The colours are symbolic:

 red for zeal and dynamism, 
 gold for mineral wealth,
 green for agriculture and forests,
 black for endurance, and 
 white for rivers and water.

Other flags
The civil air ensign is a copy of the British Civil Air Ensign, with the Guyanese flag in the canton.  The naval ensign of Guyana is a version of the national flag, with proportions of 1:2.

As part of the British Empire, Guyana's flag was a Blue Ensign with the colonial badge in the fly. An unofficial red version was used at sea. The first flag was introduced in 1875 and was changed slightly in 1906 and 1955. Like all British Ensigns, the colonial flags of Guyana were all ratio 1:2.

Presidential Standards
The Presidential Standard of Guyana came into effect by Proclamation issued on 23 February 1970. Subsequent Presidents have amended this Proclamation to replace the description of the flag contained, to reflect the Presidential Standard they wish to introduce for the duration of their presidency.

Joint Services

References

External links

 	 

Flags introduced in 1966
National flags
Flag